Pius Melia (b. at Rome, 12 January 1800; d. in London, June 1883) was an Italian Jesuit theologian.

Life

Melia entered the Society of Jesus on 14 August 1815, taught literature at Reggio, and afterwards was engaged in preaching. He left the Society in 1853.

Works

He wrote two books: "Alcune ragioni del P. Pio Melia della C. di G." (Lucca, 1847), a defence of the Society of Jesus, and "Alcune affirmazioni del Sig. Antonio Rosmini-Serbati (Pisa, s. d.), an attack upon Antonio Rosmini-Serbati. In his "Life of Rosmini", Fr. Lockhart declares that the latter work was written by certain Italian Jesuits; Father Augustin de Backer, in his "Dictionnaire des Antonymes", attributed it to Passaglia, but his "Bibliothèque de la Compagnie de Jésus", re-edited by Carlos Sommervogel, follows Beorchia who attributes it to Melia. Melia, who attacked especially Rosmini's doctrine on original sin, was answered by Rosmini (Milan, 1841) and Pagani (Milan, 1842); then began a bitter controversy which had to be ended by a direct command of Pope Pius IX.

References

Attribution
 The entry cites:
Sommervogel, Bibl. de la C. de J., V (Brussels and Paris, 1894); 
Lockhart, Life of Rosmini (London, 1886).

External links
 

1800 births
1883 deaths
19th-century Italian Jesuits
19th-century Italian Roman Catholic theologians
Former Jesuits
Jesuit theologians